The following article presents a summary of the 2000 football (soccer) season in Paraguay.

First division results

Torneo Apertura
The Apertura tournament was played in a two-round all-play-all system, with the champion being the team with the most points at the end of the two rounds.

Torneo Clausura
The Clausura tournament was played in a single all-play-all system. At the end, the top eight teams qualified to a playoff stage to determine the Clausura champion.

Clausura playoff stage
The top eight teams qualified to this stage and were given bonus points based on their final standing in the table. Two groups of four teams were made, with the top two of each group advancing to a playoff stage.

Group stage
Group A

Group B

Semifinals

|}

Clausura final

|}

Olimpia wins the Clausura tournament final by aggregate score of 4-1.

National championship game
Since Olimpia won both the Apertura and Clausura tournaments they were declared as the national champions and no playoff game was played.

To determine the second place an extra game between the Apertura runners-up (Sol de America) and the Clausura runners-up (Guarani) was played. Guaraní won the game and were declared runners-up of 2000 (aggregate score of 5-4; first leg 3-1 win by Sol, second leg 4-1 win by Guarani).

Relegation / Promotion
 Universal automatically relegated to the second division after finishing last in the average points table based over a three-year period.
 Libertad promoted to the first division by winning the second division tournament.

Qualification to international competitions
Olimpia qualified to the 2001 Copa Libertadores by winning the Torneo Apertura and Torneo Clausura.
Guaraní qualified to the 2001 Copa Libertadores by finishing as runners-up of the 2000 season.
The remaining spot for Copa Libertadores was decided in the Pre-Libertadores playoff tournament.

Pre-Libertadores playoff
Four teams participated based on aggregate points during the year.

Since Cerro and 12 de Octubre finished tied in points an extra match was played, with Cerro winning 4-2 and qualifying to the 2001 Copa Libertadores.

Lower divisions results

Paraguayan teams in international competitions
2000 Copa Libertadores:
Cerro Porteño: round of 16
Olimpia: group stage
Atl. Colegiales: group stage
Copa MERCOSUR 2000:
Cerro Porteño: group stage
Olimpia: group stage

Paraguay national team

References
 Paraguay 2000 by Eli Schmerler, Andy Bolander and Juan Pablo Andrés at RSSSF
 Diario ABC Color

 
Seasons in Paraguayan football
Paraguay 2000